The Women's 200 metres at the 1988 Summer Olympics in Seoul, South Korea had an entry list of 60 competitors, with eight qualifying heats (60), four second-round races (32) and two semi-finals (16), before the final (8) took off on Thursday September 29, 1988.

At the 1988 Olympic Trials, her 21.77 American record already showed Florence Griffith-Joyner was going to be a contender against the East Germans who had dominated the sprints for the previous decade. Marita Koch had retired but her equal Heike Drechsler was here. In the quarter-final round, Griffith-Joyner improved to 21.76, but then she had set the world record in the 100 metres. The semi-finals the following day showed she had more, her 21.56 was a .15 improvement on the world record. More than a quarter century later, the time still stands as the second fastest 200 metres ever run by a woman. The final was more impressive, Griffith-Joyner gradually making up the stagger on Grace Jackson to her outside and Merlene Ottey running about equal through the turn.  From there she simply pulled away from the best in the world. The tall Jackson was able to separate from her Jamaican teammate but was still three long steps behind Griffith-Joyner.  Inhibited by the tight turn of lane 1, Drechsler made a late rush on the inside to catch Ottey for bronze.

21.34 knocked another .22 off her world record from earlier in the day (.37 taken from the world record on one day). The time has never been approached since. Jackson, in second place in this race missed the previous world record by .01 and did not look in contention. Five women have since surpassed Koch and Drechsler's world record, including 4th place Ottey twice.

Medalists

Records
These were the standing world and Olympic records (in seconds) prior to the 1988 Summer Olympics.

The following World and Olympic records were set during this competition.

Results

Heats
First 3 from each heat (Q) and the next 8 fastest (q) qualified for the quarterfinals.

Quarterfinals
First 4 from each heat qualified directly (Q) for the semifinals.

Semi finals

Final

See also
 1984 Women's Olympic 200 metres (Los Angeles)
 1986 Women's European Championships 200 metres (Stuttgart)
 1987 Women's World Championships 200 metres (Rome)
 1990 Women's European Championships 200 metres (Split)
 1991 Women's World Championships 200 metres (Tokyo)
 1992 Women's Olympic 200 metres (Barcelona)

References

External links
  Official Report

2
200 metres at the Olympics
1988 in women's athletics
Women's events at the 1988 Summer Olympics